Margaseh (also Romanized as Margāseh; also known as Margāseh-ye Bālā) is a village in Alan Rural District, in the Central District of Sardasht County, West Azerbaijan Province, Iran. At the 2006 census, its population was 107, in 24 families.

References 

Populated places in Sardasht County